Michael Nassoro (born 13 July 1956) is a Tanzanian boxer. He competed at the 1980 Summer Olympics and the 1984 Summer Olympics.

References

1956 births
Living people
Tanzanian male boxers
Olympic boxers of Tanzania
Boxers at the 1980 Summer Olympics
Boxers at the 1984 Summer Olympics
Commonwealth Games competitors for Tanzania
Boxers at the 1982 Commonwealth Games
Place of birth missing (living people)
Light-heavyweight boxers